Huiakama is a settlement in inland Taranaki, in the western North Island of New Zealand. It is located just to the north of Strathmore on State Highway 43.

Education
Huiakama School is a coeducational full primary (years 1–8) school with a decile rating of 6  and a roll of (as at ). The school was founded in 1896.

Notes

Further reading

General historical works

Arts and literature

People

Schools

Stratford District, New Zealand
Populated places in Taranaki